The South African Football Players Union (SAFPU) is a trade union that represents football (soccer) players in South Africa. It has a membership of approximately 1000 members who are all current players and about 159 former (retired) footballers. The union and is affiliated with the Congress of South African Trade Unions, and FifPro and FifPro Africa.

External links
 SAFPU official site.

Association football trade unions
Soccer players in South Africa
Trade unions based in Johannesburg
Trade unions established in 1997
Trade unions in South Africa
Sports organisations of South Africa
Association football player non-biographical articles